The Manchester–Preston line runs from the city of Manchester to Preston, Lancashire, England. It is largely used by commuters entering Manchester from surrounding suburbs and cities, but is also one of the main railway lines in the North West and is utilised by TransPennine Express regional services and to Scotland. It was announced in December 2009 that the line would be electrified, following an announcement in July 2009 that the Chat Moss line between Manchester and Liverpool was to be electrified first. The electrification work for this line commenced in May 2015 and was due for completion in May 2018, but was delayed until December 2018.

Electric service commenced on 11 February 2019. 

The line is one of the busiest in the North West, with eight trains per hour in each direction during the off-peak daytime timetable. The line speed is currently 100 mph.

There is a large variety of rolling stock on this line, current rolling stock include Classes 150, 156, 158 and 195 DMUs, 331 and 397 EMUs and 769 and 802 BMUs. Former rolling stock on this line include Classes 142, 153, 175, 180 and 185 DMUs and 319 and 350 EMUs.

History 
The line was opened as far as Bolton in 1838 by the Manchester and Bolton Railway, then extended in 1841 by the Bolton and Preston Railway. These were amalgamated, via the East Lancashire Railway, as part of the Lancashire and Yorkshire Railway.

Route
The route now has 2 starting points in Manchester:
 Manchester Piccadilly, which offers rail links to most large cities in the country. Trains using the route will call at the through platforms 13 and 14 on the west side of the station.
 Manchester Victoria was the original starting point before the Windsor Link was created. It goes through Salford Central, after which it then joins the line from the Windsor Link and enters Salford Crescent.

The route then continues to Clifton, and then passes through Kearsley, Farnworth and Moses Gate following the Irwell Valley for much of the route. The first major town is  Bolton. Just after Bolton station there is a junction to the right where the Ribble Valley line, a single track line, heads off to Blackburn and Clitheroe. The line cuts through the western suburbs of Bolton including Lostock, where trains to Wigan Wallgate via Westhoughton, branch off. Next is Horwich Parkway opened in 1999 and Blackrod (where the former Horwich Branch diverged). It then proceeds through the town of Adlington and on to Chorley, passing through , which opened in 2011 and finally joins the West Coast Main Line at Euxton Junction before continuing via Leyland to Preston.

Operators

Northern Trains operate local services over the full length of the line.

These were temporarily diverted to via  and Chat Moss but resumed in May 2019 after the completion of the electrification of this line.

Avanti West Coast, and formerly Virgin Trains West Coast, services occasionally use this line (non-stop) when the West Coast Main Line is closed via  on their main Scotland to London route via .

Other TOCs operate along the southern section of the route to Ordsall Lane Jn and go on to Warrington:

Freight and diversions
The line is an important diversionary route at weekends, used in conjunction with the Crewe–Manchester line to divert away from a large section of the West Coast Main Line if required. The convenience is that this only adds 35–40 minutes to a journey and negates the need for costly bus replacement services. Some freight still uses this line (such as stone trains from the Peak District to a distribution terminal at Hope St., Salford and "Bin-liner" refuse trains from Pendleton to Scunthorpe), especially during the peak periods during the day. It is, however, a primary passenger route in the North West of England.

Trains
In the other direction, they all worked to  although engineering works resulted in some services working to  instead. 
Prior to 2007, Class 175 trains worked the majority of these services before the 185s took over. Between May 2001 and December 2006, they worked all  and  services and the majority of the  services. However, they never worked to Scotland due to this being a Virgin CrossCountry service until December 2007. 

TransPennine Express use mainly newer Class 397 Civitys on the line having replaced the older Class 350 units. Class 185 units still appear occasionally when the Class 397 Civity units are unavailable. 

Northern Trains operate a variety of rolling stock for their services, with Class 331s, Class 323s and Class 319. Northern also use Class 195s, Class 158s, Class 156s, Class 153s, Class 150s on the line.

Since December 2019, services between / and  have been run using Class 331 units.

Electrification
Work on 25 kV OHL electrification of the line began in May 2015 and has included numerous bridgeworks plus the major undertaking of the re-boring of Farnworth Tunnel. Its high profile resulted in a visit from Chancellor of the Exchequer, George Osborne, shortly after work started, and from Transport Secretary Patrick McLoughlin in August 2015 during the reboring work. Breakthrough was achieved in late, rather than early October, due to loose sand delaying the work in August; the first trains running through the new twin track bore on Monday 14 December 2015. Electrification of the line was due for completion by December 2016, then delayed until December 2017 and then further delayed until May 2018. In January 2018 yet another delay was announced. This was attributed to difficult ground conditions including hard rock and running sand resulting from old mine workings. Test trains (Virgin Pendolino) finally ran between Preston and Manchester in December 2018.  The first scheduled passenger-carrying electric services began on 11 February 2019, running to Blackpool North, Buckshaw Parkway, Manchester Victoria and Manchester Airport using Class 319 EMUs.

References

See also

Manchester and Bolton Railway

Rail transport in Lancashire
Railway lines in North West England